Robert Adolfo Wainwright (born December 27, 1973) is a Filipino-American former professional basketball player and coach.

Playing career
Wainwright was directly hired by Sta. Lucia Realtors in 2000 from the Cebu Gems where he was a star in the Metropolitan Basketball Association.

He played with the Realtors in 2000 before playing for the Shell Turbo Chargers from 2001 to 2002. In 2003, he was acquired by the Coca-Cola Tigers. After 4 years, Wainwright played for the Rain or Shine Elasto Painters from 2006 to 2009. He was instrumental in transforming Rain or Shine into title contenders.

In 2009, he helped the Philippine Patriots win the inaugural ASEAN Basketball League crown.

Coaching career
Wainwright was signed by ABL club Saigon Heat 2012 as an assistant coach for the team.

In June 2014, Wainwright was signed by then-expansion team Kia Sorento as an assistant coach to head coach Manny Pacquiao.

References

External links

1973 births
Living people
American men's basketball players
Barako Bull Energy Boosters players
Basketball players from California
Filipino men's basketball players
Junior college men's basketball players in the United States
Philippine Patriots players
Powerade Tigers players
Rain or Shine Elasto Painters players
Shell Turbo Chargers players
Sportspeople from Vallejo, California
Sta. Lucia Realtors players
Filipino men's basketball coaches
American men's basketball coaches
American sportspeople of Filipino descent
Citizens of the Philippines through descent
Terrafirma Dyip coaches
Rain or Shine Elasto Painters coaches